Parinari occidentalis is a species of tree in the family Chrysobalanaceae. It is native to South America.

References

occidentalis
Trees of Peru
Trees of Brazil
Trees of Bolivia
Trees of Colombia